In Real Life is a Canadian reality show where eighteen kids aged 12–14 race across North America and compete in a series of real-life jobs, aimed to "discover the skills, strength, and stamina it takes to make it in real life." The show is developed and produced by Apartment 11 Productions.  The show is hosted by Canadian comedian and actress, Sabrina Jalees.

The winner was 14-year-old Zachary Tng from Calgary, Alberta.

The third season premiered on YTV on October 3, 2011 and the season finale aired on December 12, 2011.  The Final Webisode, first introduced in Season 2, will return again this season but with a twist - two fans will also have the opportunity to compete alongside the two challengers.  This season, challengers will "soldier their way to the top as army recruits, try to avoid the sting of elimination as beekeepers, work on Broadway with the cast and crew of the hit musical Stomp, and perform gravity-defying aerobatics as stunt pilots."  As with the previous seasons, the winner walked away with "college tuition money and a dream vacation for 4." The episodes were never released beyond airing.

Contestants

Ages at time of filming
Mackenzie Hartloff, of the Orange Team, is the younger sister of season one In Real Life runner-up, Maddison Hartloff.

Results

 This contestant won the Big Reward
 This contestant won the Wrench
 This contestant found the Shield
 This season, the contestants chose their own teammate after the Obstacle Course challenge
 At the end of 4th experience, the five remaining teams had the opportunity to pair up with a new teammate.  The original teams were:
Pink Team: Brad and Sydney
Teal Team: Msgana and Talston
Yellow Team: Abhinav and Zachary
 Because Brad and Sydney won the wrench in the 4th experience and chose to pair up with a new teammate, two wrenches were used during this experience. Kelly & Andreas received both and couldn't make up time lost with being wrenched twice.
 Only one contestant was eliminated during this episode as the two challengers from the last place team competed in a showdown. The winner of this showdown would then continue on in the competition
 Beginning in this experience, all teams were dissolved and the remaining challengers competed solo

Red means the contestant was eliminated.
Dark Red means the contestant used a shield but was eliminated.
Purple  means the contestant used a shield to escape elimination.
Violet  means the contestant used a shield, but won a duel to escape elimination.
Gold means the contestant won the competition.
Silver means the contestant was the runner-up.
» or ⊃ represents the contestant who used the wrench,« or ⊂ represents the contestant who got delayed by it.

Episode Summary

Episode 1: Army Recruits 
Airdate: October 3, 2011
Location: Montreal, Quebec

 Prize: Digital Camera
 Shield: Not Found

Notes:
 The very first task, the obstacle course, was done individually and did not affect team standings, however contestants who placed lowest got to pick their partners.
 1st To Pick - Andreas picked Kelly and they became the Purple team
 2nd To Pick - Eman picked Tanner and they became the Blue team
 3rd To Pick - Anna picked Sam and they became the Green team
 4th To Pick - Abhinav picked Zach and they became the Yellow team
 5th To Pick - Msgana picked Talston and they became the Teal team
 6th To Pick - Mackenzie picked Amanda and they became the Orange team
 7th To Pick - Ashley picked Ted and they became the Red team
 8th To Pick - Sydney picked Brad and they became the Pink team
 Not Chosen - Louivannah and Chase were not picked and they became the Grey team
Kelly would have chosen her partner 6th if she had not been chosen by Andreas
Ted would have chosen his partner 8th if he had not been chosen by Ashley
 The Blue Tem completed the Tent job Second, But the  other part of the challenge was to heat up and Eat a Bag of Rations, The Blue Team accidentally Heated up their Rations in their Chemical heating Pad, Eating the rations after they touched the pad could make them sick. They got their Rations confiscated and after the job they were put in Last Place.

Episode 2: Beekeepers
Airdate: October 10, 2011
Location: Mirabel, Quebec

 Prize: iPod Dock
 Wrench Used on: Pink Team
 Shield  Not Found

Episode 3: Construction Workers
Airdate: October 17, 2011
Location: Ottawa, Ontario

 Prize: BMX Bike
 Wrench Used on: Red Team
 Shield:  Found by Green Team (Anna, Sam)

Episode 4: Stadium Crew
Airdate: October 24, 2011
Location: Vancouver, British Columbia

 Prize: iPod Scoreboard Dock
 Wrench Used On: Orange Team
 Shield: Not found

Notes:
 At the end of this experience, Sabrina gave the remaining teams an opportunity to split from their teammates, and go with someone else
 Both Brad and Sydney from the Pink Team, Talston from the Teal Team and Zach from the Yellow Team stepped up- Purple and Green Teams stayed together
 Zach and Talston became the new Teal Team, Abhinav and Sydney became the new Yellow Team, and Msgana and Brad became the new Pink Team
 Both Sydney and Brad kept the wrench, meaning both Yellow and Pink now have the wrench

Episode 5: Loggers
Airdate: November 7, 2011
Location: Squamish, British Columbia

 Prize: Portable DJ Console
 Wrenches Used On: Purple Team during job 1 and job 3
 Shield: Not found

Episode 6: Marine Survivalists 
Airdate: November 14, 2011
Location: Halifax, Nova Scotia

 Prize: Underwater Camera Goggles 
 Wrench Used On: Pink Team
 Shield: Not found

Episode 7: Broadway Stars
Airdate: November 21, 2011
Location: New York City, New York

 Sam and Anna, from the Green Team, participated in a final showdown - a "Stomp"-off - to determine who would be eliminated.  Each challenger was required to perform three short routines from Stomp - musical pipes, wooden sticks and cymbals.  Anna was able to complete all routines first and was safe, while Sam was unable to complete any and was eliminated.
 Prize: Portable Karaoke equipment
 Wrench Used on: Yellow Team
 Shield:  Found by Teal Team (Talston & Zach)/ Used by Teal Team (Talston & Zach) and Green Team (Sam & Anna)

Episode 8: Pizza Chefs
Airdate: November 28, 2011
Location: Ridgewood, New Jersey

 Though Sydney and Abhinav both won the Wrench in the Broadway Stars experience, only one challenger was able to use it. Although Abhinav completed the dough job before Sydney, her dough was deemed the best moving her into fourth and awarding her the wrench while Abhinav was put in last place.
 Prize: Portable Video iWear 
 Wrench Used On: Abhinav
 Shield: Not Found

Episode 9: Railroad Workers
Airdate: December 5, 2011
Location: Pleasant Valley, California

 Prize: Seadoo Sea Scooter
 Wrench Used On: Zachary
 Shield: Not Found

Episode 10: Stunt Pilots
Airdate: December 12, 2011
Location:  King City, California

Numbers of the superscript indicate total points earned to task; numbers in brackets indicate points earned on that particular task
 Grand Prize: $10,000 scholarship and trip for 4 to Mexico
 Consolation Prize: Tablet Computer
 Wrench Used On: Sydney

Notes:
 Abhinav was eliminated after the second challenge, leaving only Sydney and Zachary to compete in the remainder of the experience.
 Zachary completed the Pre-Flight Inspection first and received a one-point advantage in the final challenge

Webisode: Wild Reptile Handlers
Viewable online (http://www.inreallife.ytv.com): December 12, 2011

Airdate: December 29, 2011

Location: Saint-Eustache, Quebec and Toronto, Ontario

First introduced in Season 2, the Final Webisode returned this season after the season finale of In Real Life. This season, two fan favourite Challengers who took part in the show participated along with 2 alternates who auditioned for the show in a Final Webisode as Wild Reptile Handlers.

The challengers that were chosen to compete were Ashley and Msgana along with Jonathan Payne from Newfoundland and Noah Cohen from Montreal. The Green Team was Ashley and Noah, and Yellow Team was Msgana and Jonathan. Some of the tasks were to find and feed cockroaches to lizards, weigh a python, feed a boa a dead mouse, and find a clue card in various tarantula tanks. Green was in first the entire time and finished in first. Yellow was last the whole time, and finished Last. There is a shortened version of this episode found on the In Real Life website, while the full version was aired on TV in December 2011.

 First Place Prize: Internet Tablet 
 Second Place Prize: Headphones

Season 3 Records

References

2011 Canadian television seasons